Following is a table of United States presidential elections in Kansas, ordered by year. Since its admission to statehood in 1861, Kansas has participated in every U.S. presidential election. As of 2020, Kansas has the longest streak of being decided by more than a 5% margin in presidential elections, with the last race this close being in 1896.

Winners of the state are in bold. The shading refers to the state winner, and not the national winner.

See also
 Elections in Kansas

Notes

References